Masoud Haghjou (born June 30, 1986) is an Iranian football player, who plays in the defender position. He is currently a member of the Iran's Premier League football club, Saba Qom.

Club career

Club career statistics

References

External links
 Masoud Haghjou at Persian League

Iranian footballers
Association football defenders
Shamoushak Noshahr players
Saba players
1986 births
Living people
People from Nur, Iran
Sportspeople from Mazandaran province